Imad Bassou (born 4 July 1993) is a Moroccan judoka.

He competed at the 2016 Summer Olympics in Rio de Janeiro, in the men's 66 kg.

His brother Issam Bassou is also a judoka.

In 2021, he competed in the men's 66 kg event at the 2021 Judo World Masters held in Doha, Qatar.

References

External links
 
 

1993 births
Living people
Moroccan male judoka
Olympic judoka of Morocco
Judoka at the 2016 Summer Olympics
Mediterranean Games bronze medalists for Morocco
Mediterranean Games medalists in judo
Competitors at the 2018 Mediterranean Games
21st-century Moroccan people